Senator Albers may refer to:

John Albers (born 1972), Georgia State Senate
Kenneth D. Albers (born 1941), South Dakota State Senate
W. W. Albers (1860–1951), Wisconsin State Senate